May Britt Hartwell (born May Britt Våland; 8 May 1968 in Sola) is a Norwegian cyclist.

She competed in track cycling at the 1996 Summer Olympics and won the Norwegian National Time Trial Championships four times (1989, 1990, 1994 and 1995). Hartwell is married to the American cyclist Erin Hartwell.

References

External links

1968 births
Living people
Norwegian female cyclists
Olympic cyclists of Norway
Cyclists at the 1996 Summer Olympics
People from Sola, Norway
Sportspeople from Rogaland